Bucklow Hill is a village in Cheshire, England whose name originates from a slight rise in the road. It is part of the civil parish of Mere and is located at the junction of the A5034 road and the B5569 road.

History
The Bucklow Hundred of Cheshire derives its name from this place. Soldiers were mustered here in 1549 to reinforce the English troops in Scotland during the Rough Wooing.
A nonconformist chapel was founded at Bucklow Hill in the 19th century.

References

Villages in Cheshire